This is a list of films produced in the Federation of Malaya (including Colony of Singapore) and Malaysia ordered by year of release in the 1960s. The film produced in Singapore after 1965 is not included in the list, and being considered to the separate page (List of Singaporean films).

For an alphabetical listing of Malaysian films see :Category:Malaysian films.

External links
Malaysian film at the Internet Movie Database
Malaysian Feature Films Finas
Cinema Online Malaysia

1960s
Lists of 1960s films
Films